Scott Mountains may refer to:

 Scott Mountains (Antarctica)
 Scott Mountains (California)

See also
Scott Mountain
Scotts Mountain